Edward Norton (born 1969) is an American actor.

Edward or Ed Norton may also refer to:
 Edward Norton (conspirator) (c. 1654–1702), English soldier and politician
 Edward Norton (MP) (1750–1786), English politician 
 Edward Norton (judge) (1807–1872), California Supreme Court justice
 Edward F. Norton (1884–1954), British soldier and mountaineer
 Edward Lawry Norton (1898–1983), American engineer
 Ed Norton (The Honeymooners), American sidekick on TV sitcom